The Tornado is a steel inverted roller coaster at the Parque de Atracciones de Madrid in Casa de Campo, Madrid, Spain. Manufactured by Intamin, it opened on May 23, 1999.

Description
It is unusual among inverted roller coasters made by Intamin in using a chain lift rather than a magnetic launcher. It features 3 inversions, 2 loops, a corkscrew, and a 30m drop to 80 km/h.

The ride was designed by Ingenieur Büro Stengel GmbH and opened on May 23, 1999. It is one of five rides at the park that form the subject of physics problems in a student workbook that won the Madrid award for teaching materials.

Ride experience

When Tornado starts, the coaster exits the station and goes up a lift hill. Riders then drop  and reach a speed of  before entering the first loop, followed by the second. The coaster then goes through a corkscrew, which is one of the inversions. It then goes into 2 or 3 helices before going through the brake run, which takes riders back into the station, where the ride ends. The ride lasts 2 minutes.

Controversies
In June 2009 the ride was temporarily closed because it was so popular with teenagers that there was risk of an accident. In 2011, a complaint that noise from the park exceeded legal limits singled out the Tornado as even noisier than two newer roller coasters in the same park, the Tarántula and the Abismo.

References

External links
On ride video
Off ride video
Pictures of Tornado

Roller coasters in Spain
Roller coasters introduced in 1999
Roller coasters manufactured by Intamin